The 1957 County Championship was the 58th officially organised running of the County Championship. Surrey won the Championship title for the sixth successive year.

Changes were applied to the points system for the Championship as follows  -
 
12 points for a win
6 points to side still batting in the fourth innings of a match in which scores finish level
2 points for first innings lead
2 bonus points for side leading on first innings if they also score faster on runs per over in first innings
If no play possible on the first two days, and the match does not go into the second innings, the side leading on first innings scores 8 points.

Table

References

1957 in English cricket
County Championship seasons